Zhang Rui (born 23 January 1997) is a Chinese table tennis player. She won three medals at the 2019 Summer Universiade. She attended Hubei University of Technology.

Achievements

WTT Series
Singles

ITTF Tours
Doubles

References

Table tennis players from Wuhan
1997 births
Living people
Chinese female table tennis players
Universiade medalists in table tennis
Universiade gold medalists for China
Universiade silver medalists for China
Medalists at the 2019 Summer Universiade